Independent Project Records is an American independent record label currently based in Bishop, California. IPR was founded by Bruce Licher in 1980 in Los Angeles, then moved to Sedona, AZ between 1992-2009.  The label started when the Project 197 7” EP was released. 1982 was when the first letterpress covers were made. IPR is a partner entity to Independent Project Press.  The label is significant for its use letterpress printing as an artistic element in packaging and helping to launch the careers of bands such as Camper Van Beethoven and Savage Republic.

History 
Licher received a Grammy nomination for the artwork for For Against's debut album on IPR, Echelons (1987).

Discography 
As listed on Esophagus.com and Discogs.com.

References

External links 
 Official website

American independent record labels
Record labels based in California
Record labels established in 1982
Companies based in Inyo County, California
Bishop, California